The 1955 Idaho State Bengals football team was an American football team that represented Idaho State University as a member of the Rocky Mountain Conference (RMC) during the 1955 college football season. In their fourth season under head coach Babe Caccia, the Bengals compiled an 8–1 record (6–0 against conference opponents), won the RMC championship, and outscored opponents by a total of 171 to 70. The team captains were Larry Kent and Howard Green.

Schedule

References

Idaho State
Idaho State Bengals football seasons
Rocky Mountain Athletic Conference football champion seasons
College football undefeated seasons
Idaho State Bengals football